Golder Cottage is one of the oldest surviving colonial houses in Upper Hutt, New Zealand. The house is used as a museum of colonial domestic life.

John Golder, a road builder in Wellington, built the cottage in 1876–77. Around the same time he married Jane Martin and together they raised 12 children in the house. The cottage remained in the family for over 100 years until the Upper Hutt City Council bought the property. The Golder's Homestead Museum Society have since renovated the building and now manage the property.

References

Buildings and structures in Upper Hutt
Heritage New Zealand Category 2 historic places in the Wellington Region
Houses completed in 1876
Houses in New Zealand
1870s architecture in New Zealand
Historic house museums in New Zealand
Historic homes in New Zealand